The 1872 New South Wales colonial election was for 72 members representing 60 electoral districts. The election was conducted on the basis of a simple majority or first-past-the-post voting system. In this election there were 8 multi-member districts returning 20 members and 52 single member districts. In the multi-member districts each elector could vote for as many candidates as there were vacancies. 12 districts were uncontested.

There were three districts that did not have a residential or property qualification, Goldfields North (1,500), Goldfields South (2,500) and Goldfields West (16,000). The average number of enrolled voters per seat in the other districts was 1,839 ranging from The Paterson (600) to The Lachlan (4,355). The electoral boundaries were established under the Electoral Act 1858 (NSW).

Election results

Argyle

Balranald

Bathurst

The Bogan

Braidwood

Camden

Canterbury

Carcoar

The Clarence

Central Cumberland

East Macquarie

East Maitland

East Sydney

Eden

The Glebe

Goldfields North

Goldfields South

Goldfields West

Goulburn

The Gwydir

Hartley

The Hastings

The Hawkesbury

The Hume

The Hunter

Illawarra

Kiama

The Lachlan

Liverpool Plains

The Lower Hunter

Monara

Morpeth

Mudgee

The Murray

The Murrumbidgee

Narellan

The Nepean

New England

Newcastle

Newtown

Northumberland

Orange

Paddington

Parramatta

The Paterson

Patrick's Plains

Queanbeyan

Shoalhaven

St Leonards

Tenterfield

The Tumut

The Upper Hunter

Wellington

West Macquarie

West Maitland

West Sydney

The Williams

Windsor

Wollombi

Yass Plains

See also 

 Candidates of the 1872 New South Wales colonial election
 Members of the New South Wales Legislative Assembly, 1872–1874

References 

1872